Maireana convexa, the mulga bluebush, is a species of flowering plant in the family Amaranthaceae, native to Western Australia. It is usually found growing in non-saline soils in the mulga habitat.

References

convexa
Endemic flora of Australia
Endemic flora of Western Australia
Plants described in 1975